Walter Hugo Gross (5 February 1904 – 17 May 1989) was a German actor. He appeared in more than one hundred films from 1933 to 1989.

Selected filmography

References

External links 

1904 births
1989 deaths
German male film actors
People from Eberswalde
Rundfunk im amerikanischen Sektor people